Tatsuhito (written: 達人, 竜人 or 竜一) is a masculine Japanese given name. Notable people with the name include:

, Japanese baseball player
, Japanese professional wrestler
, Zainichi-Korean professional wrestler

Japanese masculine given names